"Country of the Knife" is an El Borak short story by Robert E. Howard.  It was originally published in the August 1936 issue of the pulp magazine Complete Stories. The story is also known as "Sons of the Hawk".

References

External links
 List of stories and publication details at Howard Works

Short stories by Robert E. Howard
Pulp stories
1936 short stories
Works originally published in American magazines
Works originally published in pulp magazines
Short stories published posthumously